The letter  (sometimes called sho or san) was a letter added to the Greek alphabet in order to write the Bactrian language. It was similar in appearance to the Anglo-Saxon and Icelandic letter thorn (þ), which has typically been used to represent it in modern print, although both are historically quite unrelated. It probably represented a sound similar to English "sh".
 

Its original name and position in the Bactrian alphabet, if it had any, are unknown. Some authors have called it "san", on the basis of the hypothesis that it was a survival or reintroduction of the archaic Greek letter San. The name "sho" was coined for the letter for purposes of modern computer encoding in 2002, on the basis of analogy with "rho", the letter with which it seems to be graphically related. Ϸ was added to Unicode in version 4.0 (2003), in an uppercase and lowercase character designed for modern typography.

The modern Cypriot Greek dialect also has an  sound, but it is represented with the combining caron , by the authors of the "Syntychies" lexicographic database at the University of Cyprus,  e.g.   "mashallah".
When diacritics are not used, an epenthetic —often accompanied by the systematic substitution of the preceding consonant letter—may be used to the same effect, e.g.  Standard Modern Greek   → Cypriot Greek  .

The Tsakonian language, considered a Hellenic language or a very divergent dialect of Greek, has a  sound.
It is spelled  or, in Thanasis Costakis' orthography, .

References 

 

Greek letters
Bactrian language
1st-century introductions
9th-century endings